Manan Joshi is an Indian television actor who is best known as Vaibhav Toshniwal in Shubh Laabh - Aapkey Ghar Mein and later notably as Dr. Anubhav Kulshresth in Kabhi Kabhie Ittefaq Sey.

Early life 
Manan Joshi is originally from Gujarat. Before pursuing his career in acting, Joshi studied engineering from Shri Bhagubhai Mafatlal Polytechnic, Mumbai, and completed his B.Tech in Mechanical Engineering. After engineering he participated in theatre and several workshops, and wrote dramas and musicals.

Career 
Joshi had never thought of becoming an actor until he was called by a casting agent after watching his garba performance, following which he featured in several advertisements. He made his television debut in 2017 as Shamsher in Star Bharat series Kaal Bhairav Rahasya. Later, in 2019, he  played Rocky Chaubey in Guddan Tumse Na Ho Payega for which he received much critical acclaim.

Post 2019, he took a break for around a year and made his comeback with Sony Sab series Shubh Laabh - Aapkey Ghar Mein as Vaibhav Toshniwal. However, he quit the series to leave for London for the shooting of an international Canadian film. In 2022, Joshi played Dr. Anubhav Kulshresth opposite Yesha Rughani in Kabhi Kabhie Ittefaq Sey.

Filmography

Television

See also 
 List of Indian actors
 List of Indian television actors

References

External links 
 

Living people
Indian television actors
Indian male soap opera actors
21st-century Indian male actors
Indian male television actors
Male actors in Hindi television
People from Gujarat
Actors from Mumbai
1993 births